George E. Kassabaum (December 5, 1920 – August 14, 1982) was an American architect, and one of the co-founders of the HOK architectural firm.

Early life 
George Edward Kassabaum was born in Atchison, Kansas. He was the only child of George Kassabaum and Dorothy Kassabaum. From a very young age he expressed an interest in becoming an architect. He graduated from Classen Senior High School in Oklahoma City in 1938.

He attended Washington University in St. Louis where he met his future partners, George Hellmuth and Gyo Obata. He earned both a bachelor's and master's degrees in architecture before graduating in 1947.

Kassabaum graduated in 1947 and began working for a local architecture firm in St. Louis founded by two faculty members of Washington University.

Career 
In 1955, he co-founded Hellmuth, Obata + Kassabaum, now known as HOK.

He was national president of the American Institute of Architects from 1968 to 1969.

Honors 

 AIA Fellowship, 1967
Honorary Fellow, Royal Architectural Institute of Canada, 1969
Honorary Fellow, La Sociedad de Arquitectos Mexicanos, 1969
Honorary Fellow, La Sociedad Columbiana de Arquitectos, 1969
Washington University Alumni Citation, 1972
Missouri Architect of the Year Award, 1978

Philanthropic service 
Kassabaum was a board member of Washington University and an Eliot Society president.

Personal life
Kassabaum married Marjory Verser in 1949. The couple had three children: Douglas, Anne, and Karen.

Kassabaum died at Barnes Hospital, St. Louis, on August 14, 1982, at the age of 61, having suffered a stroke three days earlier at his home in Ladue, a suburb of St. Louis.

External links 

 HOK Co-founder George Kassabaum (1921-1982) on YouTube
60 Years of Design and Innovation at HOK on Youtube
 HOK website

References 

1921 births
1982 deaths
20th-century American architects
American company founders
Washington University in St. Louis alumni
Architects from St. Louis
Presidents of the American Institute of Architects
Fellows of the American Institute of Architects